Makins is a surname. Notable people with the surname include:

Ernest Makins (1869–1959), British military officer and politician
Roger Makins, 1st Baron Sherfield, British Ambassador to the United States from 1953 to 1956.
William Makins (1840–1906), English barrister and politician
Makins Baronets

Surnames of English origin